D0 motorway, formerly R1 expressway, or Prague Ring Road, also called the outer ring road, is a motorway in the Czech Republic. It is an outer ring of Prague and its first segment was opened in the 1980s. There is also an inner Prague Municipal Ring Road, which is still under construction as well.

 40 km, from the planned length 80 km, are in operation. Two disjunct sections are opened to the public, one going all the way from the Ruzyně Airport to the interchange with the D1 highway, the other one being a  road on the eastern border of Prague. A section connecting these two segments is to be built next. Other segments under preparation include a controversial bridge over the Vltava river near Suchdol, with locals proposing the road to be built in a less inhabited location to the north.

Images

External links
 Road and Motorway Directorate of the Czech Republic
 Prague outer ring (Czech only)
 Expressways in the Czech Republic

R01
Proposed roads in the Czech Republic
Ring roads